The women's 50 metre freestyle competition at the 2002 Pan Pacific Swimming Championships took place on August 26–27 at the Yokohama International Swimming Pool.  The last champion was Jenny Thompson of US.

This race consisted of one length of the pool in freestyle.

Records
Prior to this competition, the existing world and Pan Pacific records were as follows:

Results
All times are in minutes and seconds.

Heats
The first round was held on August 26.

Semifinals
The semifinals were held on August 26.

Final 
The final was held on August 27.

References

2002 Pan Pacific Swimming Championships
2002 in women's swimming